Rahaq (also Romanized as Raḩaq) is a village in Kuh Dasht Rural District, Neyasar District, Kashan County, Isfahan Province, Iran. As of 2021, its population is 632, in 251 families.

References 

Populated places in Kashan County